Catchword is a naming firm that creates company and product names. Headquartered in Oakland, California with an East Coast office in New Jersey, Catchword has created names for companies in the technology, food and beverage, consumer products, financial services, healthcare and automotive industries.

Corporate history 
Catchword was founded in May 1998 by Maria Cypher, Laurel Sutton, and Burt Alper. The company initially focused on technology and start-up companies, but later broadened its scope to cover other industries. In January 2001, Mark Skoultchi joined the company to head East Coast operations at its New Jersey office. Since 2014, the company has been headed by Cypher and Skoultchi.

Catchword is a member of the Global Naming Network, which comprises naming firms from around the world collaborating on creative work and linguistic analysis.

Services 
Services offered by Catchword include company and product naming; tagline creation; naming strategy, architecture, and protocol; linguistic analysis; trademark prescreening, naming research and copywriting.

Apart from naming services, Catchword reviews brand names on its website. The company also runs the online site PopNamer, featuring name games in which the general public submits name ideas for trends, social phenomena and existing products and companies. Catchword also operates The Catchword Accelerator, a marketplace for brandable domain names.

Clients/Names 
Catchword has created notable product and company names such as Refreshers (for Starbucks); Atlas (for Volkswagen); Upwork (for Elance-oDesk); Attain (for Aetna); Fibrance, Valor and ClearCurve (for Corning);  GoMotion (for SportsEngine); Optane (for Intel); Nature’s Promise (for Ahold); Storyscape (for FoxNext); Charge, Flex, Surge, One, Zip, and Force (for Fitbit); Sam ’76 (for Boston Beer); Keysight  (spinoff of Agilent); Crazy 8 (for Gymboree); Dreamery (for Dreyer's); Infusion (for Spalding); Javiva (for Peet's Coffee & Tea); Kijiji (for eBay); Snap’d (for Kellogg’s Cheez-It brand); Vantara (for Hitachi); Maxify (for Canon); Relieva (for Allergan); Photoshop Elements (for Adobe); Asana; Bridgespan Group; FireEye; Medallia, Soluna; Ursa and Vudu.

Catchword’s clients include Aetna, Allergan, Amazon, AMC Networks, Canon USA, Capital One, CBRE, The Clorox Company, Corning, Dunkin' Brands, Fitbit, General Motors, Hitachi, The Home Depot, Intel, McDonald’s, PwC, Safeway, SEGA, Stack Overflow, Stryker, Uber, Unilever and Wells Fargo Bank.

Awards

References

External links 

Branding companies of the United States
Companies based in Oakland, California
1998 establishments in California